There are three battles with this name, occurring near the island of Ponza:

Battle of Ponza (1300)
Battle of Ponza (1435)
Battle of Ponza (1552)